Howe is an English surname. Historically the surname was most commonly found in the Northeast of England and the Orkney and Shetland islands.

Notable people with the surname include:

A–H
 Albion P. Howe (1818–1897), American Union Army general in the American Civil War
 Andrew Howe (born 1985), American-born Italian long jumper
 Anthony Howe (historian) (born 1950), English historian
 Anthony Howe (sculptor) (born 1954), American artist
 Art Howe (born 1946), American professional baseball player and manager
 Brian Howe (singer) (1953–2020), English musician (Bad Company)
 Brian Howe (politician) (born 1936), Australian politician
 C. D. Howe (1886–1960), Canadian politician
 Caroline Dana Howe (1824–1907), American writer
 Charlotte Howe, Viscountess Howe (1703–1782), British courtier and politician
 Daniel Walker Howe (born 1937), American historian
 Darcus Howe (1943–2017), British broadcaster and columnist
 David Howe (speedway rider) (born 1982), British motorcycle speedway rider
 David J. Howe (born 1961), British writer, journalist, publisher, and media historian
 Denis Howe (editor), editor, founder of the Free On-line Dictionary of Computing (FOLDOC)
 Denis Howe (1928–2020), English footballer
 Don Howe (footballer, born 1917) (1917–1978), English footballer of the 1930s, '40s and '50s
 Don Howe (1935–2015), English footballer
 Dylan Howe (born 1969), English jazz drummer
 Eddie Howe (born 1977), football manager and former English footballer
 Edgar Watson Howe (1853–1937), American novelist
 Elias Howe (1819–1867), American inventor of the sewing machine
 Eliot Howe (1882-1921), American film director
 Elizabeth Howe (1635–1692), accused of witchcraft and hung during the Salem witch trials
 Elliot C. Howe (1828–1899), American botanist
 Emanuel Howe, 2nd Viscount Howe (1700–1735), British politician and colonial administrator
 Emeline Harriet Howe (1844–1934), American poet
 Edward Gardiner Howe (1849–1931), American educator and author
 Frederic C. Howe (1867–1940), Ohio Senator and commissioner of Ellis Island
 Geoffrey Howe (1926–2015), British politician, Chancellor of the Exchequer under Margaret Thatcher
 George Howe (disambiguation), several people
George Howe, 3rd Viscount Howe (1725–1758), British Army general
George Howe (printer) (1769–1821), Australian printer, editor and poet
George Howe (merchant) (1819–1899), American merchant and industrialist
George Curzon-Howe, 2nd Earl Howe (1821–1876), British peer
George Frederick Howe (1856–1937), British civil servant
George Howe (architect) (1886–1955), American architect
George Howe (actor) (1900–1986), English actor and comedian
George Howe (attorney) (1824–1888), American lawyer
George Howe (footballer) (1924–1971), English footballer
George Howe (priest) (born 1952), Anglican priest
George A. Howe (died 1909), Massachusetts politician
George W. Howe, American psychologist
Sir George Grobham Howe, 1st Baronet (c. 1627–1676), English politician
George L. Howe (1898–1977), author and intelligence operative in World War II
George Howe (politician), American politician in the Michigan House of Representatives
 George William Osborn Howe (1875–1960), British electrical engineer
 Gilman Bigelow Howe (1850–1933), American genealogist
 Gordie Howe (1928–2016), Canadian Hall-of-Fame hockey player
 Greg Howe (born 1963), American musician
 Harrison E. Howe (1881–1942), American chemist
 Henry Howe (actor) (1812–1896), English actor
 Henry Marion Howe, (1848–1922), American metallurgist
 Herbert Alonzo Howe (1858–1926), American astronomer and educator

I–Z
 Irving Howe (1920–1993), American literary and social critic
 Jackie Howe (1861–1920), Australian sheep shearer
 James Wong Howe (1899–1976), Chinese-born American cinematographer
 James Lewis Howe (1859–1955), American chemist
 Jamie Howe (born 1984), American auto racing reporter
 Jeremy Howe (born 1973), English footballer
 Jeremy Howe (born 1990), Australian rules football player
 Jeremy Howe (born 1956), English radio drama editor
 John Howe (illustrator) (born 1957), Canadian illustrator
 John Howe (theologian) (1630–1705), English Puritan theologian
 John Grubham (Jack) Howe (1657–1722), English politician
 Joseph Howe (1804–1873), Nova Scotia politician
 Josias Howe (c.1611–1701), English divine
 Julia Ward Howe (1819–1910), American poet and author, best known as author of the "Battle Hymn of the Republic"
 Leila Hassan Howe (born 1948), British editor and activist.
Les Howe (1895–1976), American baseball player
 Linda Moulton Howe (born 1942), American investigative journalist and documentary maker
 Louis McHenry Howe (1871–1936), political advisor to President Franklin D. Roosevelt
 Mark Howe (born 1955), younger son of Gordie Howe, American–Canadian Hall-of-Fame hockey player
 Marshall Avery Howe (1867–1936), American botanist
 Marty Howe (born 1954), older son of Gordie Howe, American–Canadian hockey player
 Mary Howe (singer) (1870–1952), American operatic soprano
 Mary Howe (1882–1964), American composer and pianist
 Michael Howe (bushranger) (1787–1818), Australian bushranger
 Michael Howe (psychologist) (1940–2002), British cognitive psychologist
 Mike Howe (1965–2021), American musician 
 Neil Howe (born 1951), American historian, economist and demographer
 Paul Howe (born 1968), British swimmer
 Paul R. Howe (born 1959) U.S. Delta Force member and firearms instructor 
 Richard Howe, 1st Earl Howe (1726–1799), British admiral in the French Revolutionary Wars and American Revolution
 Robert Howe (Continental Army officer) (1732—1786), American general
 Roger Evans Howe (born 1945), American mathematician
 Russell Warren Howe (1925–2008), British author and journalist
 Samuel Gridley Howe (1801–1876), American abolitionist and educator
 Sarah Howe (fraudster) (c. 1826–1892), American fraud artist
 Sarah Howe (born 1983), Chinese–British poet
 Shauna Howe (1981–1992), American murder victim
 Sean Howe, American journalist and writer
 Scrope Howe, 1st Viscount Howe (1648–1714), English politician who took part in the Glorious Revolution
 Sonia E. Howe (born 1871), Russian essayist
 Steve Howe (baseball) (1958–2006), American baseball player
 Steve Howe, (born 1947), English musician and songwriter (Yes)
 Stuart Howe (born 1967), Canadian operatic tenor
 Susan Howe (born 1937), American poet, scholar, essayist, and critic
 Tamara Howe (born 1965), daughter of Darcus Howe, English television production manager
 Timothy O. Howe (1816–1883), American politician
 Tina Howe (born 1937), American playwright
 Vic Howe (1929–2015), Gordie Howe's brother, Canadian hockey player
 Wallace Howe, (1878–1957), American actor
 William Howe, 5th Viscount Howe (1729–1815) British general in the American Revolution
 William B. W. Howe (1823–1894), sixth Bishop of South Carolina in the Episcopal Church
 W. B. W. Howe, Jr. ( 1851–1912), an architect in Charleston, South Carolina

Fictional characters
 Cameron Howe, from the television drama series Halt and Catch Fire
 Rebecca Howe, on the sitcom Cheers
 Simon Howe, on the soap opera Brookside

See also
 Justice Howe (disambiguation)
 Hao (surname)
 Hau (surname)
 How (surname)
 Howe (disambiguation)
 Howes (disambiguation)

References

English-language surnames